Izabela Helena Kloc, née Lazar (born 8 May 1963 in Mikołów) is a Polish politician. She was elected to the Sejm on 25 September 2005, getting 5,185 votes in 30 Rybnik district as a candidate from the Law and Justice list.

She recently said that "in a parliamentary democracy, it is unacceptable that [public] media only criticise the work of the government." This is a notable statement, as it is generally accepted throughout the centuries that in a parliamentary democracy, freedom of speech is one of the cornerstones of that democracy, in which the media are considered the guard dog of that democracy.

See also
Members of Polish Sejm 2005-2007

External links
Izabela Kloc - parliamentary page - includes declarations of interest, voting record, and transcripts of speeches.
  - concerning her recent conviction that media should not just criticise the work of the government.

1963 births
Living people
People from Mikołów
Members of the Polish Sejm 2005–2007
Women members of the Sejm of the Republic of Poland
Law and Justice politicians
21st-century Polish women politicians
Members of the Polish Sejm 2007–2011
MEPs for Poland 2019–2024